Spurlockville (also Spurlocksville) is an unincorporated community in central Lincoln County, West Virginia, United States.  It lies south of the town of Hamlin, the county seat of Lincoln County.  Its elevation is 758 feet (231 m).  Spurlockville has a post office with the ZIP code 25565.

References

Unincorporated communities in Lincoln County, West Virginia
Unincorporated communities in West Virginia